Scotland were represented at the 2010 Commonwealth Games in Delhi. They used Flower of Scotland as its victory anthem for these games; replacing Scotland the Brave which had been in use since the 1950s. The change was decided by the Scottish athletes in a vote.

Medalists

| align="left" valign="top"|

| align="left" valign="top"|

Aquatics

Diving

Team Scotland consists of 3 divers over 4 events

Men

Women

Swimming

Team Scotland consists of 21 swimmers over 24 events.

Men

Men – EAD (Para-Sports)

Women

Women – EAD (Para-Sports)

Synchronised swimming

Women

Archery

Team Scotland consists of 10 archers over 7 events

Men

Women

Athletics

Team Scotland consists of 19 athletes over 16 events

Men – Track

Men – Throws

Men – Jumps

Men – Combined

Men – Road

Men – EAD (Para-Sports)

Women – Track

Women – Throws

Women – Jumps

Women – Combined

Women – Road

Women – EAD (Para-Sports)

Badminton

Team Scotland consists of 8 badminton players over ? events

Men
Watson Briggs Doubles, mixed doubles, Team
Keiran Merilees Team
Paul Van Rietvelde Team

Women
Imogen Bankier Mixed doubles, doubles, team
Jillie Cooper Mixed doubles and team
Susan Eglestaff Singles and team
Kirsty Gilmour Singles, doubles, team
Emma Mason Mixed doubles, doubles, team

Mixed

Team Event

Boxing

Team Scotland consists of 6 boxers over 6 events

Men

Cycling

Team Scotland consists of 19 cyclists over ? events

Road
Men

Women

Track

Men
Ross Edgar, Andrew Fenn, James McCallum, Evan Oliphant, John Paul,
Chris Pritchard, Callum Skinner, Kevin Stewart

Women
Kate Cullen, Jenny Davis, Charline Joiner, Eileen Roe

Gymnastics

Team Scotland consists of 7 gymnasts over 18 events

Artistic
Men
Adam Cox, Ryan McKee

Women
Jordan Lipton, Amy Regan, Tori Simpson, Emma White

Rhythmic
Women
Vicky Clow

Hockey

Team Scotland consists of 32 hockey players over the 2 team events.

Summary

Men
Scotland Squad: 
Kenneth Bain, Stephen Dick, Alan Forsyth, Cameron Fraser, Gareth Hall, William Marshall, Vishal Marwaha, Alistair McGregor, 
Gordon McIntyre, Graham Moodie, Chris Nelson, Mark Ralph, Derek Salmond, Iain Scholefield, Niall Stott, Ross Stott

Pool A

Women
Scotland Squad: 
Louise Baxter, Alison Bell, Vikki Bunce, Aimee Clark, Linda Clement, Holly Cram, Leigh Fawcett, Catriona Forrest, 
Samantha Judge, Nikki Kidd, Emily Maguire, Kareena Marshall, Morag McLellan, Becky Merchant, Chris(tine) Nelson, Ailsa Robertson, Abi Walker

Pool A

Lawn Bowls

Team Scotland consists of 12 lawn bowls players over 6 events

Men

Women

Rugby Sevens

Summary

Men
Mike Adamson, Alexander Blair, David Callam, Scott Forrest, Chris Fusaro, John Houston, 
Lee Jones, Stuart McInally, Scott Newlands, Hefin O'Hare, Colin Shaw, Andrew Turnbull

Group A

Shooting

Team Scotland consists of 15 shooters over 21 events

Clay Target – Men

Clay Target – Women

Pistol – Men

Pistol – Women

Small Bore & Air Rifle – Men

Small Bore & Air Rifle – Women

Full Bore – Open

Squash

Team Scotland consists of 6 squash players over 3 events.

The competition draw was announced on 22 September 2010. (Seeds are denoted in brackets after players' names) 

Men's Singles

Women's Singles

Men's Doubles

Women's Doubles

Mixed Doubles

Table Tennis

Team Scotland consists of 3 table tennis players over 3 events.

Men

Tennis

Team Scotland consists of 5 players over 5 events.

Men
Colin Fleming Singles and Doubles
Jamie Murray Doubles

Women
Mhairi Brown Singles and Doubles
Jocelyn Rae Doubles

Mixed

Weightlifting

Team Scotland consists of 3 weightlifters over 3 events.

Men

Wrestling

Team Scotland consists of 10 wrestlers over 10 events.

Men – Freestyle

Women

See also
 Commonwealth Games Council for Scotland
 Scotland at the 2006 Commonwealth Games

References

2010
Nations at the 2010 Commonwealth Games
Commonwealth Games